= Crack Hill =

Illegal drug trade venue in Paris

- Colline du crack
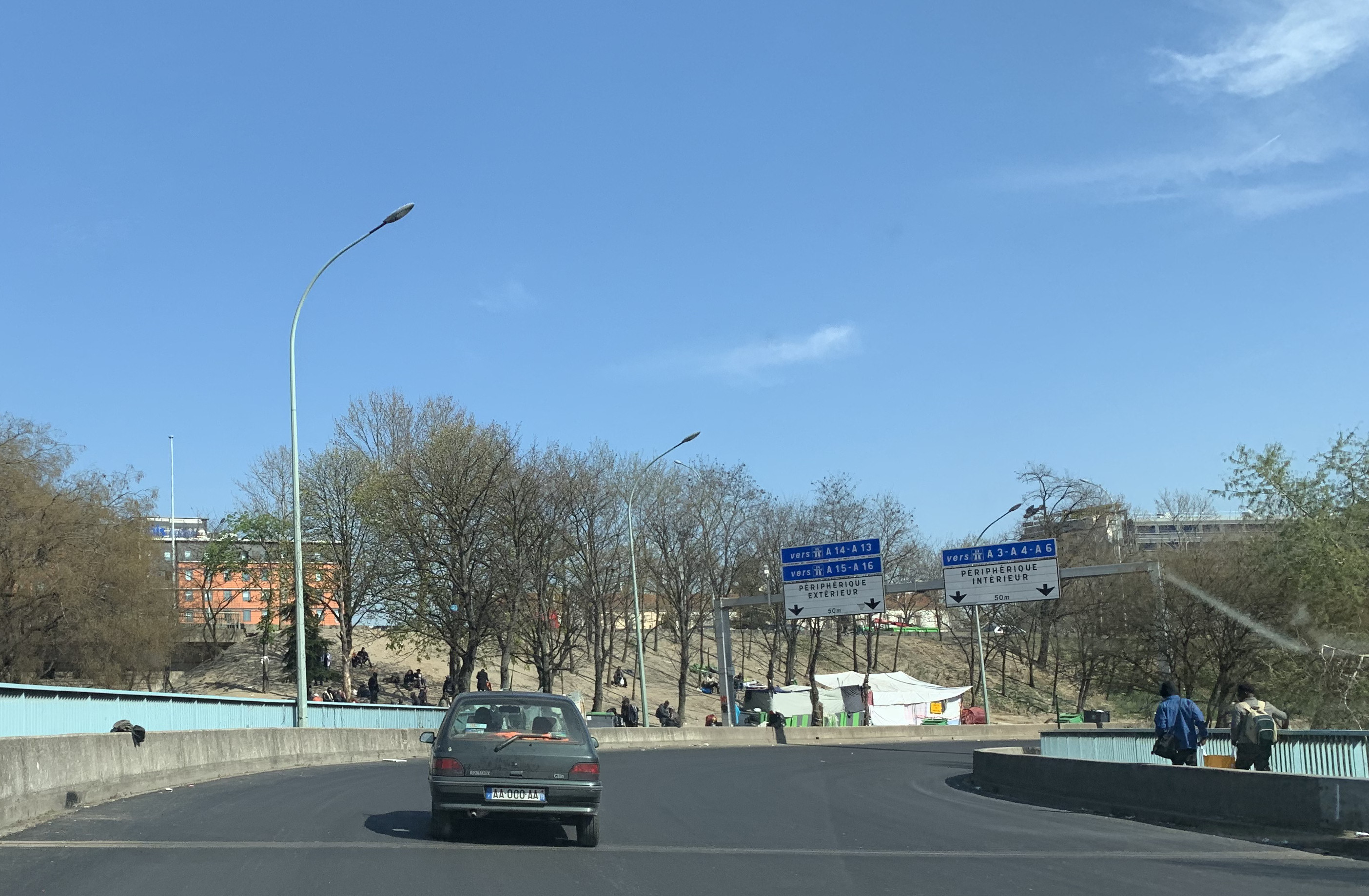
- A view of a part of the camp on the motorway interchange, on march 30th 2019

- Location of the venue in central Paris Crack Hill (France)
- Location: Paris, France
- Coordinates: 48°54′02″N 2°21′37″E

Crack Hill is the name given to an illegal drug trade camp located near Porte de la Chapelle in the north of Paris, related to the city's crack crisis. It is a wasteland which has become a place for the dealers and consumers of this highly addictive drug to gather. Hundreds of drug addicts are squatting there day and night in an open drug marketplace.

Its name comes from a median strip on the Porte de la Chapelle motorway interchange, where the first drug addicts settled.

The hill has been evacuated more than a dozen times. In April 2019, according to BFM Paris, Paris City Hall planned to open a reception and rest center for drug addicts.
